Cyclotoma cingalensis, is a species of handsome fungus beetle found in Sri Lanka.

Description
This very small, convex beetle has a length of about 3.9 to 5.4 mm. Body highly convex. Body long, very smooth and shiny. Body covered with dense and coarse punctures. Dorsum yellow to dark yellowish brown. Antennae with 10 segments with large and stout scape. Pronotum middle part, club of antennae and elytra along suture are black. Each elytron with five large black spots. Scutellum blackish. Ventrum and legs blackish brown. Pronotal disc moderately convex. There are transverse blackish spots at the base.

References 

Endomychidae
Insects of Sri Lanka
Insects described in 1886